Ocypteromima is a genus of parasitic flies in the family Tachinidae. There are about five described species in Ocypteromima.

Species
These five species belong to the genus Ocypteromima:
 Ocypteromima angustipennis (Villeneuve, 1916)
 Ocypteromima elegans (Villeneuve, 1916)
 Ocypteromima malaya (Townsend, 1926)
 Ocypteromima orientalis (Townsend, 1928)
 Ocypteromima polita Townsend, 1916

References

Further reading

 
 
 
 

Tachinidae
Articles created by Qbugbot